This is a list of the first women lawyer(s) and judge(s) in New Mexico. It includes the year in which the women were admitted to practice law (in parentheses). Also included are women who achieved other distinctions such becoming the first in their state to graduate from law school or become a political figure.

Firsts in New Mexico's history

Lawyers 

First female admitted: Henrietta Hume Pettijohn Buck (1892) 
 First female (actively practice): Nellie C. Brewer Pierce (1908) 
First Hispanic American female: Betty Ann Camunez (1972) 
First Pueblo female: Carol Jean Vigil (c. 1977)  
First undocumented female: Jazmín Irazoqui-Ruiz in 2017

State judges 

 First female: Olga Melinda Victoria Miller in 1910 
 First female (district court): Mary Coon Walters (1962) in 1972  
 First Mexican American female (Second Judicial District): Patricia A. Madrid (1973) in 1978 
 First female (New Mexico Supreme Court): Mary Coon Walters (1962) in 1984 
 First female (New Mexico Court of Appeals): Christina Armijo (1975) from 1996-2011 
 First Native American (Pueblo) (female): Carol Jean Vigil (c. 1977) in 1998  
 First African American female (district court): Angela Jewell in 1999  
 First female (Chief Justice; New Mexico Supreme Court): Pamela B. Minzner (1972) in 1999  
 First Hispanic American female (Chief Justice; New Mexico Supreme Court): Petra F. Jimenez Maes (1973) in 2003 
 First openly lesbian female (New Mexico Court of Appeals): Linda Vanzi in 2010
 First female (Seventh Judicial District): Mercedes C. Murphy in 2014
First female (Sixth Judicial District): Jennifer Delaney 
First African American (female) (New Mexico Court of Appeals): Shammara Henderson in 2020

Federal judges 
First female (Navajo Nation Judicial Branch): Marie Roanhorse Neswood from 1976–1989  
First (Latino American) female (U.S. District Court for the District of New Mexico): Martha Vázquez (1978) in 1993

Attorney General of New Mexico 

 First Mexican American female: Patricia A. Madrid (1973) in 1999

District Attorney 

 First female: Margaret Weldon Lamb (1969) from 1978-1980

Political Office 

First Hispanic American female (Governor of New Mexico): Susana Martinez (1986) in 2011  
First Hispanic American female (elected from the Democratic Party as the Governor of New Mexico): Michelle Lujan Grisham (1987) in 2018

State Bar of New Mexico 

 First African American female admitted: Barbara Brown Simmons (c. 1974)  
 First female president: Amanda L. Ashford in 1990 
First Latino American female president: Mary Torres in 2002

Firsts in local history

 Barbara Brown Simmons (c. 1974): First African American female graduate from the University of New Mexico School of Law [Bernalillo County, New Mexico]
 Kari Brandenburg: First female District Attorney for Bernallilo County, New Mexico (2000)
 Kea Riggs: First female district court judge in Chaves County, New Mexico
 Esther Smith Van Soelen: First female lawyer in Clovis, New Mexico [Curry County, New Mexico]
 Olga Melinda Victoria Miller: First female judge in Doña Ana County, New Mexico (1910)
 Nancy Beard: First female Magistrate Judge in Eddy County, New Mexico
 Edith Gutierrez: First female (non-attorney) judge in Silver City, New Mexico [Grant County, New Mexico]
 Bettye Dean: First female magistrate in Lincoln County, New Mexico (1983)
 Irene Saiz Mirabal-Counts: First female to serve as a Magistrate Judge in Otero County, New Mexico (2016)

See also  

 List of first women lawyers and judges in the United States
 Timeline of women lawyers in the United States
 Women in law

Other topics of interest 

 List of first minority male lawyers and judges in the United States
 List of first minority male lawyers and judges in New Mexico

References 

Lawyers, New Mexico, first
New Mexico, first
Women, New Mexico, first
Women, New Mexico, first
Women in New Mexico
New Mexico lawyers
Lists of people from New Mexico